Juciūnai (formerly) is a village in Kėdainiai district municipality, in Kaunas County, in central Lithuania. According to the 2011 census, the village had a population of 18 people. There is a wooden chapel (built in 1817) in the cemetery of Juciūnai, also two roofed poles monuments are located in the village.

History
Juciūnai has been known since 1604. In the 19th century there was Juciūnai village and manor (later a folwark; a property of the Kulviečiai family).

Demography

References

Villages in Kaunas County
Kėdainiai District Municipality